Eccles was a parliamentary constituency of the United Kingdom, centred on the town of Eccles in Greater Manchester, England.  It returned one Member of Parliament (MP) to the House of Commons of the Parliament of the United Kingdom, elected by the first past the post system.

History 
The constituency was established under the Redistribution of Seats Act 1885 for the 1885 general election, and abolished at the 2010 general election.

Boundaries

1885–1918

The constituency, known as South East Lancashire, Eccles Division, was defined as consisting of the civil parishes of Barton upon Irwell, Clifton, Flixton, Urmston, Worsley and the part of the parish of Pendlebury not in the Parliamentary Borough of Salford.

1918–83
The Representation of the People Act 1918 redrew all constituencies in Great Britain and Ireland. The Parliamentary Borough of Eccles consisted of two local government districts: the Municipal Borough of Eccles and the Urban District of Swinton and Pendlebury (later incorporated as a borough). The seat was renamed Eccles Borough Constituency by the Representation of the People Act 1948.

1983–97
In 1983 constituency boundaries were altered to align with the new administrative geography introduced by the Local Government Act 1972. Eccles became a borough constituency in the parliamentary county of Greater Manchester, consisting of seven wards of the City of Salford: Barton, Eccles, Pendlebury, Swinton North, Swinton South, Weaste and Seedley, and Winton.

1997–2010
The boundaries of the constituency were altered for 1997 general election, reflecting a change in ward boundaries. It was defined as consisting of the following wards: Barton, Cadishead, Eccles, Irlam, Pendlebury, Swinton North, Swinton South and Winton.

Abolition 
Following its review of parliamentary representation in Greater Manchester, the Boundary Commission for England recommended that Eccles be split between two new constituencies:

Salford and Eccles, from the existing Salford constituency and the central/eastern part of Eccles.
Worsley and Eccles South, from the existing Worsley constituency and the southern/western part of Eccles.

These constituencies were used from the 2010 general election.

Members of Parliament

Elections

Elections in the 2000s

Elections in the 1990s

Elections in the 1980s

Elections in the 1970s

Elections in the 1960s

Elections in the 1950s

Elections in the 1940s

Elections in the 1930s

Elections in the 1920s

Elections in the 1910s

Elections in the 1900s

Elections in the 1890s

Elections in the 1880s

See also 
 List of parliamentary constituencies in Greater Manchester

Notes and references 

Parliamentary constituencies in Greater Manchester (historic)
Constituencies of the Parliament of the United Kingdom established in 1885
Constituencies of the Parliament of the United Kingdom disestablished in 2010
Politics of Salford
Eccles, Greater Manchester